Events from the year 1973 in the United States.

Incumbents

Federal government 
 President: Richard Nixon (R-California)
 Vice President:
 until October 10: Spiro Agnew (R-Maryland)
 October 10–December 6: vacant
 starting December 6: Gerald Ford (R-Michigan)
 Chief Justice: Warren E. Burger (Minnesota)
 Speaker of the House of Representatives: Carl Albert (D-Oklahoma)
 Senate Majority Leader: Mike Mansfield (D-Montana)
 Congress: 92nd (until January 3), 93rd (starting January 3)

Events

January

 January 1 – CBS sells the New York Yankees baseball team for $10 million to a 12-person syndicate led by George Steinbrenner ($3.2 million more than CBS paid for the Yankees).
 January 7 – Mark Essex kills four civilians and three police officers during a siege at the Downtown Howard Johnson's Motor Lodge in New Orleans. Ten hours after the siege began, Essex is killed by a volley of gunfire from police officers stationed inside a Marine helicopter.
 January 14 
Elvis Presley's concert in Hawaii is the first worldwide telecast by an entertainer watched by more people than the Apollo Moon landings. However, it is not shown in Eastern Bloc countries because of communist censorship (with the sole exception of East Germany, where it is shown on Der schwarze Kanal). In the United States and Brazil, it does not air until April of this year.
Super Bowl VII: The Miami Dolphins defeat the Washington Redskins 14–7 to complete the National Football League's first (and only, thus far) perfect season.
 January 15 – Vietnam War: Citing progress in peace negotiations, President Richard Nixon announces the suspension of offensive action in North Vietnam.
 January 20 – President Nixon and Vice President Agnew are sworn in for their second term.
 January 22
Roe v. Wade: The U.S. Supreme Court overturns state bans on abortion.
Former President Lyndon B. Johnson dies at his ranch in Johnson City, Texas, leaving no former U.S. president living until the resignation of Richard Nixon in 1974.
George Foreman wins boxing's World Heavyweight Championship, defeating Joe Frazier by technical knockout in the second round at Kingston, Jamaica. 
 January 23 – President Nixon announces that a peace accord has been reached in Vietnam.
 January 27 – U.S. involvement in the Vietnam War ends with the signing of the Paris Peace Accords. The U.S. military draft is also abolished on this same day, as the Nixon administration announces on this day that there will be no draft calls in 1973, and that it will not request an extension of the U.S. government’s draft authority, which goes on to expire on June 30 of this year.
 January 30 – G. Gordon Liddy is found guilty of Watergate charges.
 January 31 – Pan American and Trans World Airlines cancel their options to buy 13 Concorde airliners.

February
 February 11 – Vietnam War: The first American prisoners of war are released from Vietnam.
 February 12 – Ohio becomes the first U.S. state to post distance in metric on signs (see Metric system in the United States).
 February 13 – The United States Dollar is devalued by 10%.
 February 21 – The 5.8  Point Mugu earthquake affected the south coast of California with a maximum Mercalli intensity of VII (Very strong). Several people were injured and damage totaled $1 million.
 February 22 – Sino-American relations: Following President Richard Nixon's visit to mainland China, the United States and the People's Republic of China agree to establish liaison offices.
 February 27 – The American Indian Movement occupies Wounded Knee, South Dakota.
 February 28 – The landmark postmodern novel Gravity's Rainbow by Thomas Pynchon is published.

March
 March 1 – Charlotte's Web, the animated film based on the children's book of the same name, is released.
 March 12 – Last episode of original Laugh-In airs on NBC. The show will continue with re-runs until May 14, 1973.
 March 17 – Many of the few remaining United States soldiers begin to leave Vietnam. One reunion of a former POW with his family is immortalized in the Pulitzer Prize-winning photograph Burst of Joy.
 March 23 – Watergate scandal (United States): In a letter to Judge John Sirica, Watergate burglar James W. McCord Jr. admits that he and other defendants have been pressured to remain silent about the case. He names former Attorney General John Mitchell as 'overall boss' of the operation.
 March 26 
 UCLA captures its seventh consecutive college basketball national championship and eighth in ten seasons under John Wooden, defeating Memphis State 87–66 in the finals of the NCAA tournament at St. Louis. UCLA center Bill Walton sets championship game records by connecting on 21 of 22 field goal attempts and scoring 44 points.
 TV soap opera The Young and the Restless and game show The $10,000 Pyramid debuts on CBS.
 March 27 – The 45th Academy Awards ceremony, hosted by Carol Burnett, Michael Caine, Charlton Heston and Rock Hudson, is held at Dorothy Chandler Pavilion in Los Angeles. Francis Ford Coppola's The Godfather wins Best Picture, also tied with Bob Fosse's adaptation of Cabaret in receiving ten nominations. The latter film wins eight awards, including Best Director for Fosse. The ceremony draws a television audience of 85 million viewers.
 March 29 – The last United States soldier leaves Vietnam.

April
 April 3 – The first handheld cellular phone call is made by Martin Cooper in New York City.
 April 4 – The World Trade Center officially opens in New York City with a ribbon cutting ceremony.
 April 6
Pioneer 11 is launched on a mission to study the Solar System.
Ron Blomberg of the New York Yankees becomes the first designated hitter in Major League Baseball.
 April 17 
Federal Express officially begins operations, with the launch of 14 small aircraft from Memphis International Airport. On that night, Federal Express delivers 186 packages to 25 U.S. cities from Rochester, New York, to Miami, Florida.
For the first time, the Army Corps of Engineers opens the Morganza Spillway near Baton Rouge to relieve record flooding along the lower Mississippi River. 
 April 26 – The first day of trading on the Chicago Board Options Exchange.
 April 28 – The last section of the IRT Third Avenue Line from 149th Street to Gun Hill Road in The Bronx is closed.
 April 30 – Watergate scandal: President Richard Nixon announces that White House Counsel John Dean has been fired and that Attorney General Richard Kleindienst has resigned along with staffers H. R. Haldeman and John Ehrlichman.

May

 May 3 – The Sears Tower in Chicago is finished, becoming the world's tallest building (record held until 1998).
 May 5 
 Secretariat wins the Kentucky Derby and sets a new time record for the event.
 Led Zeppelin plays before 56,800 people at Tampa Stadium on the band's 1973 North American Tour, thus breaking the August 15, 1965, record of 55,600 set by The Beatles at Shea Stadium.
 May 8 – A 71-day standoff between federal authorities and American Indian Movement activists who were occupying the Pine Ridge Reservation at Wounded Knee, South Dakota, ends with the surrender of the militants. 
 May 10 – The New York Knicks defeat the Los Angeles Lakers, 102–93 in Game 5 of the NBA Finals to win the NBA title.
 May 13 – Bobby Riggs challenges and defeats Margaret Court, the world's #1 women's player, in a nationally televised tennis match set in Ramona, CA northeast of San Diego. Riggs wins 6–2, 6-1 which leads to the huge Battle of the Sexes match against Billie Jean King later in the year on September 20.
 May 14 – Skylab, the United States' first space station, is launched.
 May 17 – Watergate scandal: Televised hearings begin in the United States Senate.
 May 19 – Secretariat wins the Preakness Stakes by  lengths over the amazingly quick second placed Sham. A malfunction in the track's timing equipment prevented a confirmed new track record.
 May 25 – Skylab 2 (Pete Conrad, Paul Weitz, Joseph Kerwin) is launched on a mission to repair damage to the recently launched Skylab space station.
 May 30 – Gordon Johncock wins the Indianapolis 500 in the Patrick Racing Special Eagle-Offenhauser, after only 133 laps, due to rain. (The race was begun May 28 but was called due to rain, and the race was unable to be restarted May 29.)

June
 June 4 – A United States patent for the Docutel automated teller machine is granted to Donald Wetzel, Tom Barnes and George Chastain.
 June 9 – Secretariat wins the Belmont Stakes by 31 lengths becoming a Triple Crown winner and breaking a 25-year hiatus since 1948.
 June 16 – U.S. President Richard Nixon begins several talks with Soviet leader Leonid Brezhnev.
The submersible is brought to the surface the following day, but two of the four men aboard die of carbon dioxide poisoning.
 June 21 – The Supreme Court of the U.S. delivers its decision in the landmark case Miller v. California, establishing the "Miller test" for determining obscenity.
 June 22 – W. Mark Felt ("Deep Throat") retires from the Federal Bureau of Investigation.
 June 24 – UpStairs Lounge arson attack: A fire at a gay bar in New Orleans' French Quarter kills 32.
 June 25 – Watergate scandal: Former White House counsel John Dean begins his testimony before the Senate Watergate Committee.

July
 July 1 – The United States Drug Enforcement Administration is founded.
 July 2 – The United States Congress passes the Education of the Handicapped Act (EHA), mandating Special Education federally.
 July 4 – MLB: The New York Mets fall  games back in last place of the National League Eastern Division.
 July 5 – A catastrophic BLEVE (Boiling Liquid Expanding Vapor Explosion) in Kingman, Arizona kills 11 firefighters. The explosion occurred after a fire broke out as propane was being transferred from a railroad car to a storage tank. This explosion has become a classic incident, studied in fire department training programs worldwide.
 July 12 – 1973 National Archives Fire: A major fire destroys the entire 6th floor of the National Personnel Records Center in St. Louis, Missouri.
 July 15 – Nolan Ryan of the California Angels pitches his second no-hitter of the season against the Detroit Tigers. He previous no-hit the Kansas City Royals exactly two months prior.
 July 16 – Watergate Scandal: Former White House aide Alexander Butterfield informs the United States Senate Watergate Committee that President Richard Nixon had secretly recorded potentially incriminating conversations.
 July 28 
 Skylab 3 (Owen Garriott, Jack Lousma, Alan Bean) is launched, to conduct various medical and scientific experiments aboard Skylab.
 The Summer Jam at Watkins Glen, a massive rock festival featuring the Grateful Dead, The Allman Brothers Band and The Band, attracts over 600,000 music fans.
 July 31 – A Delta Air Lines Flight 173 DC9-31 aircraft lands short of Boston's Logan Airport runway in poor visibility, striking a sea wall about 165 feet (50 m) to the right of the runway centerline and about 3,000 feet (914 m) short. All 6 crew members and 83 passengers are killed, one of the passengers dying several months after the accident.

August
 August 8 – Serial killer, rapist, kidnapper and torturer Dean Corll is shot to death by one of his teenage accomplices, Elmer Wayne Henley, at Corll's home in Pasadena, Texas. Henley turns himself in and confesses, uncovering the Houston mass murders, a series of murders in which 28 young boys had been abducted, tortured and murdered by Corll and his accomplices Henley and David Brooks (who is also arrested).
 August 11
 DJ Kool Herc originates the hip hop music genre in New York City.
 The second film directed by George Lucas, American Graffiti is released.
 August 15 – The U.S. bombing of Cambodia ends, officially halting 12 years of combat activity in Southeast Asia.

September
 September 11 – American singer Art Garfunkel finally releases his solo debut album Angel Clare, 17 years after starting his career.
 September 20
 The Battle of the Sexes:  Billie Jean King defeats Bobby Riggs in a televised tennis match, 6–4, 6–4, 6–3, at the Astrodome in Houston, Texas. With an attendance of 30,492, this remains the largest live audience ever to see a tennis match in US history. The global audience that views on television in 36 countries is estimated at 90 million.
 Singer-songwriter Jim Croce dies following a gig at Northwestern State University in Natchitoches, Louisiana, having boarded a small chartered plane that crashes on takeoff; all six people aboard are killed.
 Baseball legend Willie Mays announces his retirement.
 September 22 – Henry Kissinger, United States National Security Advisor, starts his term as United States Secretary of State.
 September 23 – In American football, the Oakland Raiders defeat the Miami Dolphins 12–7, ending the Dolphins' unbeaten streak at 18. It is the Miami Dolphins' first loss since January 16, 1972 in Super Bowl VI.
 September 28 – ITT is bombed in New York City by the Weather Underground, protesting its involvement in the 1973 Chilean coup d'état.
 September 30 – Yankee Stadium, known as "The House That Ruth Built," closes for a two-year renovation at a cost of $160 million. The New York Yankees play all of their home games at Shea Stadium in 1974 and 1975.

October

 October 1 – The Ideal Toy Company debuts the Evel Knievel stunt-cycle, which would go on to become one of the best-selling toys of Christmas 1973.
 October 6 – American Country Countdown, a country music-oriented spin off of the nationally syndicated radio program American Top 40, debuts with host Don Bowman. The countdown, featuring the top 40 country hits of the week according to the Billboard magazine Hot Country Singles chart, becomes a major success.
 October 10 
 Spiro T. Agnew resigns as Vice President of the United States. In federal court in Baltimore, Maryland, he pleads no contest to charges of income tax evasion on $29,500 he received in 1967, while he was governor of Maryland. He is fined $10,000 and put on 3 years' probation.
 The New York Mets win the National League pennant.
 October 20 – The Saturday Night Massacre: U.S. President Richard Nixon orders Attorney General Elliot Richardson to dismiss Watergate Special Prosecutor Archibald Cox. Richardson refuses and resigns, along with Deputy Attorney General William Ruckelshaus. Solicitor General Robert Bork, third in line at the Department of Justice, then fires Cox. The event raises calls for Nixon's impeachment.
 October 21 – The Oakland A's repeat as champions of Major League Baseball, defeating the New York Mets 5–2 in game 7 of the World Series. 
 October 27 – The Canon City meteorite, a 1.4 kilogram chondrite type meteorite, strikes Earth in Fremont County, Colorado.

November

 November 1 – Watergate scandal: Acting Attorney General Robert Bork appoints Leon Jaworski as the new Watergate Special Prosecutor.
 November 3 
Pan Am Flight 160, a Boeing 707-321C, crashes at Logan International Airport, Boston, killing three.
Mariner program: NASA launches Mariner 10 toward Mercury (on March 29, 1974, it becomes the first space probe to reach that planet).
 November 7 – The Congress of the United States overrides President Richard Nixon's veto of the War Powers Resolution, which limits presidential power to wage war without congressional approval.
 November 8 – Walt Disney Productions' 21st feature film, Robin Hood, is released to critical praise and box office success, though critical reception has gradually waned over the years.
 November 11 – Egypt and Israel sign a United States-sponsored cease-fire accord.
 November 16 
Skylab program: NASA launches Skylab 4 (Gerald Carr, William Pogue, Edward Gibson) from Cape Canaveral, Florida, on an 84-day mission.
U.S. President Richard Nixon signs the Trans-Alaska Pipeline Authorization Act into law, authorizing the construction of the Alaska Pipeline.
 November 20 – The animated Thanksgiving special A Charlie Brown Thanksgiving premieres on CBS. It ends up winning an Emmy Award the following year.
 November 17 – Watergate scandal: In Orlando, Florida, U.S. President Richard Nixon tells 400 Associated Press managing editors "I'm not a crook."
 November 21 – U.S. President Richard Nixon's attorney, J. Fred Buzhardt, reveals the existence of an -minute gap in one of the White House tape recordings related to Watergate.
 November 27 – The United States Senate votes 92–3 to confirm Gerald Ford as Vice President of the United States.

December

 December 3 – Pioneer program: Pioneer 10 sends back the first close-up images of Jupiter.
 December 6 – The United States House of Representatives votes 387–35 to confirm Gerald Ford as Vice President of the United States; he is sworn in the same day.
 December 15
 Gay rights: The American Psychiatric Association removes homosexuality from its DSM-II.
 SeaWorld Orlando opens to the public.
 December 16 – O. J. Simpson of the Buffalo Bills becomes the first running back to rush for 2,000 yards in a pro football season.
 December 26 – The Exorcist, the film adaptation of William Peter Blatty's 1971 bestselling novel, is released in 30 theaters nationwide. Long lines form as it becomes a huge success, helped by accounts of audiences fainting and vomiting.
 December 28 – The Endangered Species Act is passed in the United States.

Ongoing
 Cold War (1947–1991)
 Space Race (1957–1975)
 Vietnam War, U.S. involvement (1964–1973)
 Détente (–1979)
 Watergate scandal (1972–1974)
 Capital punishment suspended by Furman v. Georgia (1972–1976)
 1973 oil crisis (1973–1974)
 1970s energy crisis (1973–1980)
 DOCUMERICA photography project (1972-1977)
 1973 Mississippi river flood(1972-1973)
 Lite Beer is introduced in the U.S. by the Miller Brewing Company.

Births

January

 January 1 – Justin Armour, football player
 January 3 – Dan Harmon, screenwriter and producer
 January 4 – Harmony Korine, director, producer, and screenwriter
 January 10
 Ajit Pai, politician and telecommunications director, Chairman of the Federal Communications Commission
 Glenn Robinson, basketball player 
 January 12 – Brian Culbertson, contemporary jazz/R&B/funk musician, instrumentalist, producer and performer
 January 15 – Alexa Avilés, politician, community activist, and non-profit manager
 January 16
 Brad Adamonis, golfer
 Josie Davis, actress
 January 18
 Burnie Burns, filmmaker
 Ed Jasper, football player (d. 2022)
 Joe Kehoskie, baseball executive
 January 19
 John Avlon, journalist and political commentator
 Aaron Yonda, YouTube celebrity
 January 21 – Chris Kilmore, rock DJ for Incubus
 January 23 – Karen Abbott, author
 January 28
 Jason Aaron, comic book writer
 Jerome Allen, basketball player
 January 29 – Jason Schmidt, baseball player
 January 30 – Jalen Rose, basketball player
 January 31 – Portia de Rossi, Australian-born actress who is married to Ellen DeGeneres

February

 February 2 – Kirk Adams, politician
 February 4
 Oscar De La Hoya, boxer
 Brett Hestla, musician and record producer
 February 7 – Juwan Howard, basketball player
 February 8 – Project Pat, rapper for The Kaze
 February 12 – Tara Strong, Canadian-born actress and voice actress
 February 13 – Jeff Angell, musician and guitarist
 February 14 – Steve McNair, football player (d. 2009)
 February 15 – Amy Van Dyken, Olympic swimmer
 February 17 – Jen Taylor, voice actress
 February 19 – Eric Lange, actor
 February 20
 Rohan Alexander, Jamaican-born cricketer
 Orlando Antigua, Dominican-born basketball player and coach
 Andrea Savage, actress, comedian, and writer
 February 21
 Jacob M. Appel, author, poet, bioethicist, physician, lawyer, and social critic
 Justin Sane, singer, guitarist, and frontman for Anti-Flag
 February 22 – Scott Phillips, drummer for Creed and Alter Bridge 
 February 24 – Chris Fehn, drummer
 February 25 – Anson Mount, actor
 February 26
 Herman Ashworth, convicted murderer (d. 2005)
 Marshall Faulk, football player
 Jenny Thompson, Olympic swimmer
 February 28 – Angela Aycock, basketball player

March

 March 1
 Anton Gunn, politician
 Kathrine Lee-Hinton, flight attendant
 Chris Webber, basketball player
 March 3 – Brett Abrahams, geneticist and neuroscientist
 March 5 – Ryan Franklin, baseball pitcher
 March 6 – Terry Adams, baseball player
 March 7
 John Aboud, writer and comedian
 Rick Emerson, radio presenter and author
 March 8 – Jahana Hayes, politician
 March 9 – Aaron Boone, baseball player
 March 10
 Natasha Alam, Uzbekistani-born actress and model
 John LeCompt, musician
 March 11 – Ernest Allen, football player
 March 14 – Betsy Brandt, actress
 March 17 – Patricia Rushton, creator and founder of PITA organization
 March 18 – Luci Christian, voice actress
 March 19
 Peter Attia, Canadian-born physician
 Bun B, rapper
 March 20
 Annemarie Carney Axon, judge
 Ronna McDaniel, politician and political strategist
 Cedric Yarbrough, actor
 March 22 – Alex Padilla, politician
 March 23 – Jason Kidd, basketball player
 March 24 – Jim Parsons, actor and producer
 March 26 
 T. R. Knight, actor
 Larry Page, computer scientist, Internet entrepreneur, and co-founder of Google
 March 28 –  Umaga, wrestler (d. 2009)
 March 29
 Juan Alejandro Ávila, Mexican-born actor
 Brandi Love, porn actress
 March 30 – DJ AM, musician and DJ (d. 2009)
 March 31 – Reese Andy, mixed martial artist

April

 April 1 – Rachel Maddow, political commentator
 April 2 – Roselyn Sánchez, Puerto Rican-born actress
 April 3 – Ashot Ariyan, Armenian-born Canadian-American composer and pianist
 April 4 – David Blaine, magician
 April 5
 Derek Kerswill, drummer
 Pharrell Williams, singer
 April 6
 Lori Heuring, actress
 Franck Marchis, astronomer
 Cindy Robinson, voice actress
 April 7 – Amy Anzel, entrepreneur, actress, producer, and television presenter
 April 8 – Emma Caulfield, actress
 April 11 – Jennifer Esposito, actress
 April 12 – Christina Moore, actress
 April 13 – Bokeem Woodbine, actor
 April 14 – Adrien Brody, actor
 April 16 – Akon, rapper, singer/songwriter, and record producer
 April 18 – Jad Abumrad, radio host
 April 20
 Todd Hollandsworth baseball player and sportscaster
 Julie Powell, food writer and memoirist (d. 2022)
 April 22
 Frank Artiles, politician
 Christopher Sabat, voice actor
 April 24 – Brian Marshall, bassist for Creed and Alter Bridge
 April 27 – Ink Aleaga, football player
 April 28
 Melissa Fahn, actress
 Jorge Garcia, actor and comedian
 Elisabeth Röhm, German-born actress
 April 29 – Steven Horsford, politician

May

 May 1 – Curtis Martin, football player
 May 7
 John Atwell, racing driver
 Lawrence Johnson, pole vaulter
 May 12
 Mackenzie Astin, actor
 Kendra Kassebaum, actress and singer
 Bobby Kent, murder victim (d. 1993) 
 Travis Lutter, mixed martial artist
 Forbes March, actor
 May 14 – Shanice, singer
 May 16
 Muna AbuSulayman, American-born Saudi businesswoman and activist
 Jason 'Weeman' Acuña, skateboarder, stuntman, and actor
 Mackenzie Astin, actor
 Tori Spelling, actress
 Keith Williams, bodybuilder and football player
 May 17
 Sasha Alexander, actress
 Josh Homme, singer/songwriter
 May 20
 Carl Anderton Jr., politician
 Ben Arthur, singer/songwriter and novelist
 May 23 – Jason Nash, dancer
 May 25
 Jean-Pierre Canlis, glass artist
 Demetri Martin, actor and comedian
 May 27 – Jack McBrayer, actor and comedian
 May 30
 Allen Aldridge, football player
 Minae Noji, actress

June

 June 1
 Heidi Klum, German-born model
 Derek Lowe, baseball player
 June 2 – Kevin Feige, filmmaker and president of Marvel Studios
 June 4 – Antonio Anderson, football player
 June 9 – Tedy Bruschi, football player
 June 10 – Faith Evans, singer
 June 11 – Dana Brunetti, producer
 June 13
 Sam Adams, football player
 Ogie Banks, voice actor
 June 15
 Neil Patrick Harris, actor, producer, singer, comedian, magician, and television host
 Greg Vaughan, actor
 June 19 – Jahine Arnold, football player
 June 20
 Aquil Abdullah, Olympic rower
 Chino Moreno, singer and frontman for Deftones
 Josh Shapiro, politician, 48th Governor of Pennsylvania
 June 21 – Juliette Lewis, actress and singer
 June 22
 Cory Alexander, basketball player and announcer
 Carson Daly, television personality and host
 June 23 – Carter Albrecht, keyboardist and guitarist for Edie Brickell & New Bohemians (d. 2007)
 June 28 – DJ Vlad, interviewer
 June 30 – Robert Bales, United States Army staff-sergeant and suspect in the Kandahar massacre

July

 July 2 – Teodross Avery, jazz saxophonist
 July 3
 Owen H.M. Smith, producer, writer, actor, and comedian
 Patrick Wilson, actor
 July 5 – Joe, singer/songwriter and record producer
 July 6
 Charizma, rapper (d. 1993)
 William Lee Scott, actor
 July 7 – Troy Garity, actor
 July 9
 Katasha Artis, basketball player
 Kelly Holcomb, football player
 Enrique Murciano, actor
 July 10 – Annie Mumolo, actress, screenwriter, comedian and producer
 July 11
 Link Abrams, American-born New Zealand basketball player
 Adam Alexander, sportscaster
 Andrew Bird, violinist and singer/songwriter
 Kris Steele, politician
 July 12 – Jay Ashcroft, attorney, engineer, and politician
 July 15 – Brian Austin Green, actor
 July 16
 Graham Robertson, filmmaker and author
 Tim Ryan, politician
 July 17
 Eric Moulds, football player
 Liam Kyle Sullivan, comedian
 Amy Steinberg, minister, singer, songwriter, musician, playwright and actress
 July 19
 Raja Krishnamoorthi, Indian-born politician
 Saïd Taghmaoui, French-born actor and screenwriter
 July 20 – Keith Aldridge, ice hockey player
 July 21 – Ali Landry, actress
 July 22 – Rufus Wainwright, American-born Canadian singer/songwriter and composer
 July 23
 Omar Epps, actor
 Nomar Garciaparra, baseball player
 Monica Lewinsky, former White House intern
 July 24
 Andy Barr, politician
 Jamie Denbo, actress
 July 25 – Tony Vincent, actor and singer
 July 29 – Wanya Morris, singer
 July 31 – Jason Archer, artist

August

 August 1 – Tempestt Bledsoe, actress
 August 3
 Flynn Adam, producer, singer, and rapper
 Chris Murphy, politician
 August 5 – Michael Hollick, actor
 August 6
 Asia Carrera, actress
 Vera Farmiga, actress
 Karenna Gore, daughter of Al Gore
 Max Kellerman, sportscaster and radio host
 August 7
 Tom Asimou, lawyer
 Ross Atkins, baseball player and executive
 August 8 
 Jessica Calvello, voice actress  
 Scott Stapp, singer/songwriter and frontman for Creed
 August 9
 Juan Alvarez, baseball player
 Kenya Barris, writer, producer, director, and actor
 August 11
 Kristin Armstrong, cyclist
 Carolyn Murphy, model
 August 15 – Kris Mangum, football player
 August 16 – Damian Jackson, baseball player
 August 20 – Todd Helton, baseball player
 August 21 – Sergey Brin, Russian-born computer scientist, Internet entrepreneur, co-founder of Google, and CEO of Alphabet, Inc. (2015-2019)
 August 22
 Howie D., singer and member of the Backstreet Boys
 Kristen Wiig, actress, comedian, writer and producer
 August 23 – Chelsi Smith, actress, singer, television host, and beauty queen (d. 2018)
 August 24
 Dave Chappelle, actor and comedian
 Grey DeLisle, voice actress and singer
 Carmine Giovinazzo, actor
 August 28 – Matthew John Armstrong, actor
 August 29 – Jason Spisak, actor, voice actor, and producer
 August 30 – Lisa Ling, journalist
 August 31
 Doug Anderson, Christian singer
 Mary Peltola, politician

September

 September 2 – Curtis Anderson, football player
 September 3 – Alexandra Kerry, actress, filmmaker, director, and producer
 September 4 – Jason David Frank, actor (d. 2022)
 September 5
 Justin Atchley, baseball player
 Rose McGowan, actress
 September 7 – Shannon Elizabeth, actress
 September 8 – Troy Sanders, singer and bassist for Mastodon and Killer Be Killed
 September 9
 Dave Schubert, artist and photographer (d. 2023)
 Jennie Kwan, actress and voice actress
 September 11 – Robby Albarado, jockey
 September 12
 Vashone Adams, football player
 Tarana Burke, civil rights activist 
 Paul Walker, actor (d. 2013)
 September 14
 Travis Allen, politician
 Dominique Arnold, hurdler
 Nas, rapper
 September 15 – Markita Aldridge, basketball player
 September 17 – Keirsten Alley, tennis player
 September 18
 Paul Anderson, politician
 James Marsden, actor
 September 19 – Amil, rapper
 September 20 – Todd Boehly, businessman and investor
 September 21 – Mike Anderson, football player
 September 22 – Bob Sapp, wrestler, actor, football player, kickboxer, and mixed martial artist
 September 24
 Diana Ayala, politician
 Eddie George, football player
 September 25 – Bridgette Wilson-Sampras, actress
 September 29 – Joe Hulbig, ice hockey player
 September 30 – David Ury, actor

October

 October 2
 Keiko Agena, actress
 Melissa Harris-Perry, political commentator
 Proof, rapper for D12 (d. 2006)
 Efren Ramirez, actor and DJ
 October 4 – Chris Parks, wrestler
 October 7 – Mark Ronchetti, meteorologist and political candidate
 October 8 – Donnie Abraham, football player and coach
 October 9
 Jennifer Aspen, actress
 Steve Burns, actor, voice actor, director, producer, television host, guitarist, musician, and singer
 October 10 – Mario Lopez, actor and entertainment journalist
 October 13 – Matt Hughes, mixed martial artist
 October 14 – George Floyd, murder victim (d. 2020)
 October 15
 Antonio Armstrong, football player (d. 2016)
 Dax Riggs, musician
 October 18 – Rachel Nichols, sports journalist
 October 21 – Lera Auerbach, Russian-born Austrian-American composer and pianist
 October 24
 Kurt Kuenne, filmmaker
 Korie Robertson, television personality
 October 26
 Rorke Denver, Navy SEAL and actor
 Seth MacFarlane, actor, screenwriter, producer, director, and singer
 October 27
 Michi Atkins, basketball player
 Lori Trahan, politician
 October 28 – Montel Vontavious Porter, wrestler
 October 30 – Dave Asprey, entrepreneur and author
 October 31
 Kate Aldrich, opera singer
 Sandra Arana, American-born Peruvian actress, model, and television presenter
 Beverly Lynne, actress

November

 November 2
 John Donley Adams, lawyer and politician
 Marisol Nichols, actress
 November 3
 Kahlil Ashanti, actor and writer
 Kirk Jones, rapper for Onyx
 Mick Thomson, guitarist
 November 5
 Johnny Damon, baseball player
 Peter Emmerich, illustrator
 November 6 – Taje Allen, football player
 November 7
 Seven Antonopoulos, drummer
 Yunjin Kim, South Korean-born actress
 November 8 – David Muir, journalist and news anchor
 November 9 – Nick Lachey, actor, singer, television personality, host, and member of 98 Degrees
November 10 Joei Cerreta 
 November 11 – Stephanie Bice, politician
 November 13
 Lynsey Addario, photojournalist
 Derrick Alexander, football player
 Jordan Bridges, actor
 November 14
 Daniel Ahlers, businessman and politician
 Kareem Campbell, skateboarder
 Lawyer Milloy, football player
 November 16 – Marcus Lemonis, Lebanese-born businessman, investor, and television personality
 November 17 – Lord Infamous, rapper for Three 6 Mafia (d. 2013)
 November 19
 Cindy Abrams, politician
 Django Haskins, singer/songwriter and guitarist
 November 20 – Sav Rocca, Australian-born football player
 November 21 – Luke Aikins, skydiver, BASE jumper, pilot, and aerial photographer
 November 23 – John Eric Armstrong, convicted serial killer
 November 24 – Amy Faye Hayes, ring announcer and model.
 November 26 – Peter Facinelli, actor
 November 28 – Gina Tognoni, actress
 November 30 – Nimród Antal, Hungarian-born director, screenwriter, and actor

December

 December 1 – Lombardo Boyar, comedian, actor, and voice artist
 December 3 – Holly Marie Combs, actress
 December 4 – Tyra Banks, supermodel, actress, and talk show host
 December 7
 Carrie Kei Heim, actress, lawyer and writer
 Terrell Owens, football player
 December 8 – Corey Taylor, singer and frontman for Slipknot and Stone Sour
 December 9 – Stacey Abrams, politician and voting rights activist
 December 10 – Arden Myrin, comedian
 December 11 – Mos Def, rapper and actor
 December 12
 Pamela L. Gay, astronomer
 Tony Hsieh, Internet entrepreneur (d. 2020)
 Paz Lenchantin, Argentine-born musician
 Denise Parker, archer
 December 14 – Thuy Trang, Vietnamese-born actress (d. 2001)
 December 15 – Jason Upton, Christian singer/songwriter
 December 16 – Scott Storch, hip-hop producer
 December 17 – Brian Fitzpatrick, politician
 December 18 – Leila Arcieri, actress, model, and businesswoman
 December 21 – Mike Alstott, football player
 December 24
 Chris Ash, football coach
 Stephenie Meyer, writer and producer
 December 25 – Chris Harris, wrestler
 December 27
 Art Atwood, bodybuilder (d. 2011)
 Wilson Cruz, actor
 December 28 – Seth Meyers, comedian, writer, producer, actor, and television host
 December 29
 Dionciel Armstrong, writer, director, and producer
 Theo Epstein, baseball general manager
 Pimp C, rap artist (d. 2007)
 December 30 – Jason Behr, actor
 December 31 – Shandon Anderson, basketball player

Full Date Unknown

 John M. Ackerman, American-born Mexican political activist, TV host, and academic
 Nick Adams, writer and author
 Titilayo Adedokun, singer and beauty queen
 Jeremy Adelman, composer
 Brad Adkins, artist and curator
 Luis Gabriel Aguilera, American-born Mexican author, writer, musician, language teacher, and social justice activist
 Roberto Aguirre-Sacasa, playwright, screenwriter, and comic book writer
 Gema Alava, Spanish-born artist
 Saleem Ali, American-born Australian scientist
 Jessica Andersen, writer
 Eric Chase Anderson, author, illustrator, and actor
 Miya Ando, artist
 Saman Arbabi, Iranian-born journalist
 Mark Archer, producer, director, and writer
 Ana Claudia Arias, Brazilian-born physicist
 Vernice Armour, Marine Captian and naval avaitor
 Mohit Aron, Indian-born computer scientist
 Kristen Ashburn, photojournalist
 Maximilian Auffhammer, environmental economist
 Hala Ayala, politician
 Pejman Azarmina, Iranian-born scholar, entrepreneur, musician, and thinkocrat
 Indo G, rapper

Deaths

 January 22 – Lyndon B. Johnson, 36th President of the United States from 1963 until 1969, 37th Vice President of the United States from 1961 until 1963 (born 1908)
 January 23 – Kid Ory, musician (born 1886)
 January 24 – J. Carrol Naish, actor (born 1896)
 January 30 – Elizabeth Baker, economist and academic (born 1885) 
 February 15 
 Wally Cox, actor (born 1924)
 Tim Holt, actor (born 1919)
 February 18 – Frank Costello, Italian-born American Mafia gangster and crime boss (born 1891)
 February 23  –  Dickinson W. Richards, physician, recipient of the Nobel Prize in Physiology or Medicine (born 1895)
 February 24 – Alice Hollister, silent film actress (born 1886)
 March 6 – Pearl S. Buck, writer, Nobel Prize laureate (born 1892)
 March 8 – Ron "Pigpen" McKernan, rock musician (born 1945)  
 March 12 – Frankie Frisch, baseball player (St. Louis Cardinals) and a member of the MLB Hall of Fame (born 1898) 
 March 18 – William Benton, U.S. Senator from Connecticut from 1949 until 1953 (born 1900)
 March 23 – Ken Maynard, actor (born 1895) 
 March 26 – George Sisler, baseball player (St. Louis Browns) and a member of the MLB Hall of Fame (born 1893)  
 April 12 – Arthur Freed, film producer (b. 1894)
 April 20 – Robert Armstrong, actor (born 1890)
 April 21 – Merian C. Cooper, aviator, director and producer (b. 1893)
 April 25 – Frank Jack Fletcher, admiral (b. 1885)
 April 26 – Irene Ryan, actress (b. 1902)
 May 6 – Myrna Fahey, actress (born 1933)
 May 8 – Alexander Vandegrift, general (born 1887)
 May 18 – Jeannette Rankin, first United States congresswoman (born 1880)
 June 1 – Mary Kornman, actress (born 1915)  
 June 21 – Frank Leahy, football player and coach (born 1908)
 June 23 – Fay Holden, actress (born 1893)  
 June 24 – Mary Carr, actress (born 1874)  
 June 26 – Ernest Truex, actor (born 1889)
 July 1 – Laurens Hammond, inventor (born 1895) 
 July 2
 Betty Grable, actress (born 1916)
 George Macready, actor (born 1889)
 July 6 – Joe E. Brown, actor and comedian (born 1891)
 July 7 – Veronica Lake, actress (born 1922)
 July 11 – Robert Ryan, actor (born 1909)
 July 12 – Lon Chaney Jr., actor (born 1906)
 July 18 – Richard Remer, athlete (born 1883) 
 July 20 
 Bruce Lee, actor, martial artist and filmmaker (born 1940)
 Robert Smithson, artist (born 1938)
 July 23 – Eddie Rickenbacker, World War I flying ace and race car driver (born 1890)
 July 25 – Edgar Stehli, French-born American actor (born 1884)
 August 8 – Dean Corll, serial killer, rapist, kidnapper and torturer (born 1939)
 August 30 – Michael Dunn, a.k.a. Gary Neil Miller, dwarf actor and singer (born 1934)
 September 20 – Jim Croce, singer (born 1943)
 October 6 – Sidney Blackmer, actor (born 1895)
 October 7 – Bonner Fellers, United States Army general (born 1896)
 October 9 – Sister Rosetta Tharpe, gospel singer (born 1915)
 December 4 – Michael O'Shea, actor (born 1906)  
 December 20 – Bobby Darin, singer-songwriter, musician, actor, dancer, impressionist and TV presenter (born 1936)
 December 26
 William Haines, actor (born 1900)  
 Harold B. Lee, president of the Church of Jesus Christ of Latter-day Saints (born 1899)

See also 
 List of American films of 1973
 Timeline of United States history (1970–1989)

References

eclipse (4,5);

External links
 

 
1970s in the United States
United States
United States
Years of the 20th century in the United States